Barloworld Limited is an industrial brand management company, founded in South Africa.  Once a large conglomerate with many unrelated businesses, ranging at various times from mining, information technology and building materials to motor vehicles, it has repositioned itself as an industrial brand management company and unbundled many of its assets. Its headquarters was at the sprawling Barlow Park campus in Sandton, Johannesburg. It had been sponsor of the Barloworld cycling team.

History

Founding and expansion (1902-2016) 
Barloworld was founded in Durban by Major Ernest (Billy) Barlow in 1902 as Thomas Barlow and Sons, selling wool products, and later engineering equipment. It was expanded by his son Charles Sydney (Punch) Barlow who expanded into the sale and service of Caterpillar products in 1927. In 1940, after moving its headquarters to Johannesburg, it listed on the JSE. Barlow entered the motor business, and eventually expanded into the manufacture of cement, paint, stainless steel and household appliances, as well as mining, through the acquisition of Rand Mines Limited in 1971, with the new company called Barlow Rand. In November 2016, Barloworld and German company BayWa entered into a joint venture (JV) to expand their agriculture and materials handling operations in Southern Africa.

Spin-offs and sales (2017-2023) 
In 2018, Barloworld Equipment had been the official Caterpillar dealer in southern Africa for 90 years. In June 2018, Barloworld sold its Iberian equipment business to Tesa S.p.A. for $180 million. Tongaat Hulett, a South African sugar producer, in February 2020 decided to sell its starch business to Barloworld for $351.10 million including debt. Barloworld's CEO Dominic Sewela announced that Barloworld would be exiting logistics in June 2020. The company purchased its starch business Ingrain from Tongaat Hulett in 2020, and that year also purchased the Caterpillar dealer Equipment Mongolia. It continued to exit its motor retail business, selling the unit to NMI Durban South Motors. In 2021, it announced plans that by 2022, it would have sold its logistics business as well as its leasing business and car rental business.

It joined the World Coal Association in May 2022. Barloworld Ltd. in August 2022 released a number of bonds that were related to goals related to the number of women in company leadership. In September 2022, Barloworld UK continued to operate the Barloworld UK Pension Scheme. In November 2022, Barloworld was sued over accusations of racism and unlawful termination. In December 2022, Barloworld's car rental unit, Zeda, was listed separately on the JSE with a valuation of $260 million. The unit included the Avis and Budget rental brands. Barloworld said it would continue to focus on renting industrial equipment to mining and consumer-goods companies.

Barloworld entered the Russian market in 1998, through its subsidiary Vostochnaya Technica. Barloworld is the official Caterpillar dealer for parts of Russia. In May 2022, Barloworld cancelled significant orders in Russia due to sanctions.

Subsidiaries
The group's subsidiaries include Barloworld Automotive, Barloworld Handling, Barloworld Logistics and Barloworld Equipment. Barloworld unbundled its interests in Pretoria Portland Cement and Barloworld Coatings (best known for the Plascon brand) in 2007. In March 2005, Barloworld bought Avis Southern Africa acquiring full ownership of the company.

Litigation

Barloworld Handling Ltd v. Unilift South Wales Ltd
On 24 March 2009, Barloworld Handling Ltd applied under s.69(1) Companies Act 2006 for a change of name for the company called Unilift South Wales Ltd.

Barloworld Handling Ltd argued that since they already acquired a company called Unilift Ltd, Unilift South Wales Ltd should change their name as Unilift Ltd had goodwill and reputation for the marketing, hiring and servicing of fork lift trucks in Swansea and Cardiff. The problems came from the fact of Unilift South Wales Ltd marketing similar products to those marketed by Unilift Ltd and as evidence of confusion, Unilift Ltd had received invoices intended for Unilift South Wales Ltd.

Barloworld Handling Ltd represented to the Company Names Tribunal that Unilift South Wales Ltd was passing off as Unilift Ltd and so they should be ordered to change their name so that there is nothing even similar to Unilift in their name or trading name.

The litigation was struck out because the Adjudicator found that the respondent had already registered its name on 18 December 2007 and was operating and had not registered a similar name to the applicant's for the purpose of trying to extort money or to prevent them from registering the name themselves. The Tribunal is there to hear complaints that respondents have been opportunistic but they do not decide on claims in the tort of passing off.

See also 
List of companies traded on the JSE
List of companies of South Africa
Economy of South Africa

References

External links 

 http://www.barloworld.com

Companies established in 1902
Conglomerate companies of South Africa
Companies based in Sandton
Branding companies
Companies listed on the Johannesburg Stock Exchange
Service companies of South Africa